Anshan Iron and Steel Group Corporation (Ansteel Group in short; less popularly Angang Group) is a Chinese state-owned steel maker. The corporation was under the supervision of State-owned Assets Supervision and Administration Commission of the State Council. It is headquartered in Anshan, Liaoning. According to World Steel Association (Chinese companies data was provided by China Iron and Steel Association), the corporation was ranked the 7th in 2015 the world ranking by production volume.

History
The group was formerly Anshan Iron & Steel Works and Showa Steel Works, which was established in 1916 under Japanese rule in Northeast China. Anshan Iron and Steel Company was established from the two places in 1948.

In 1997, a subsidiary Angang Steel is incorporated and listed some of the assets of the group in the stock exchanges.

In 2005, a plan to merge Anshan Iron and Steel and Benxi Iron and Steel was announced, but never materialized.

In 2010 Panzhihua Iron and Steel was merged into Anshan Iron & Steel Group Corporation.

In August 2021, Ansteel and Ben Gang Group Corporation, began the process of merging and restructuring that will create the world's third-largest steelmaker. According to the deal, Ben Gang will become a subsidiary of Ansteel.

References

External links
 

Manufacturing companies established in 1948
Steel companies of China
Government-owned companies of China
Companies based in Liaoning
Anshan